The Chicago, St. Paul, Minneapolis and Omaha Railroad Passenger Station is a former train station located in Rice Lake, Wisconsin. It was added to the National Register of Historic Places in 2007.

History
The Chicago, St. Paul, Minneapolis and Omaha Railroad Passenger Station was built in 1909, replacing and an earlier station. It was operated by The Omaha Road until 1957, when the line was leased by the Chicago and North Western Transportation Company. The station closed in 1979.

References

Railway stations on the National Register of Historic Places in Wisconsin
Railway stations in the United States opened in 1909
National Register of Historic Places in Barron County, Wisconsin
Rice Lake
Railway stations closed in 1957
Prairie School architecture in Wisconsin
Former railway stations in Wisconsin